The Bamma Vickers Lawson House (also known as the Lawson House or Parris Lawson House) is a historic house located at 1133 U.S. Route 1 in Sebastian, Florida.

Description and history 
It was added to the National Register of Historic Places on July 26, 1990.

References

External links
 Indian River County listings at National Register of Historic Places
 Indian River County listings at Florida's Office of Cultural and Historical Programs

Houses on the National Register of Historic Places in Florida
National Register of Historic Places in Indian River County, Florida
Houses in Indian River County, Florida
Houses completed in 1911
1911 establishments in Florida
Vernacular architecture in Florida